Several ships of the Swedish Navy have been named HSwMS Sjöormen, named after the sea serpent:

  was a  launched in 1941
  was a  launched in 1967 and sold to Singapore in 1997

Swedish Navy ship names